James Henry Roberts Cromwell (June 4, 1896 – March 19, 1990) was an American diplomat, candidate for the United States Senate, author, and one-time husband of Doris Duke, "the richest girl in the world". He was the United States Ambassador to Canada.

Life and career

He was born on June 4, 1896, in Manhattan, the son of Lucretia Bishop "Eva" Roberts and Oliver Eaton Cromwell. His sister Louise Cromwell Brooks was the first wife of General of the Army Douglas MacArthur and the third wife of the famous stage and film actor Lionel Atwill. He grew up in Philadelphia after his widowed mother married Edward T. Stotesbury in 1912 and moved there. 

Cromwell's first wife was automotive company heiress Delphine Ione Dodge, the only daughter of Horace Dodge of Grosse Pointe, Michigan, one of the two co-founders of the Dodge Motor Company. They were married from June 17, 1920 until their divorce on September 28, 1928, and had one daughter, Christine Cromwell, in 1922.

On February 13, 1935, Cromwell married Doris Duke. Both supported Franklin Roosevelt and his New Deal. He published books to present his economic ideas and advocated tighter control of the Federal Reserve. In 1940, for 142 days, he was the United States Ambassador to Canada. He resigned to enter the election for U.S. Senator from New Jersey, a race he lost to incumbent Senator William Warren Barbour. After bitter and protracted legal proceedings Cromwell and Duke divorced on December 21, 1943.

Cromwell was married to his third wife, Maxine MacFetridge, from April 24, 1948, until her death on July 7, 1968.  Their daughter, Maxine Hope Cromwell (later Hopkins), was born in New York on November 17, 1948.  Germaine Benjamin was Cromwell's fourth and last wife, from September 27, 1971 until her death in December 1986. 

Cromwell died in the Marin Terrace retirement home in Mill Valley, California, at the age of 93.

Books by Cromwell
 The Voice of Young America, C. Scribner's sons, 1933
 In Defense of Capitalism, C. Scribner's sons, 1937

References

1896 births
1990 deaths
20th-century American diplomats
20th-century American writers
Ambassadors of the United States to Canada
New Jersey Democrats
Writers from Manhattan
Writers from New Jersey
Writers from Philadelphia